General Hodges may refer to:

Courtney Hodges (1887–1966), U.S. Army general
Ben Hodges (born 1955),  U.S. Army lieutenant general 
Harry Foote Hodges (1860–1929), U.S. Army major general
Henry Clay Hodges Jr. (1860–1963), U.S. Army major general
Henry C. Hodges (1831–1917), U.S. Army brigadier general
John Neal Hodges (1884–1965), U.S. Army brigadier general

See also
General Hodge (disambiguation)